Grönroos is a Swedish-language surname, more common in Finland than in Sweden.

Geographical distribution
As of 2014, 87.5% of all known bearers of the surname Grönroos were residents of Finland (frequency 1:2,486), 10.7% of Sweden (1:36,469) and 1.1% of Estonia (1:48,951).

In Finland, the frequency of the surname was higher than national average (1:2,486) in the following regions:
 1. Satakunta (1:953)
 2. Southwest Finland (1:994)
 3. Åland (1:1,042)
 4. Uusimaa (1:1,484)

In Sweden, the frequency of the surname was higher than national average (1:36,469) in the following counties:
 1. Uppsala County (1:14,573)
 2. Södermanland County (1:18,614)
 3. Örebro County (1:20,372)
 4. Halland County (1:20,386)
 5. Östergötland County (1:23,031)
 6. Västerbotten County (1:26,440)
 7. Stockholm County (1:26,710)
 8. Västernorrland County (1:27,107)

People
 Börje Grönroos (born 1929), Finnish boxer
 Christian Grönroos (born 1947), Finnish economist

References

Swedish-language surnames